Evangeline Made: A Tribute to Cajun Music is an album of Cajun music by various pop and rock musical artists, released in 2002. It reached number 6 on the Billboard Top World Music chart and was nominated for Best Traditional Folk Album at the 45th Grammy Awards.

History
Producer Ann Savoy's goal for Evangeline Made was to demonstrate the affection of popular artists for Cajun music. She enlisted various pop performers along with members of BeauSoleil, her own group with her husband accordionist Marc Savoy and fiddler Michael Doucet of the Savoy Doucet Cajun Band, as well as other musicians to "renew and extend Cajun tradition rather than simply re-create it".

Vocal performances include two duets by Linda Ronstadt and Savoy, John Fogerty, Rodney Crowell, Patty Griffin, Nick Lowe, Maria McKee, Richard Thompson, Linda Thompson and David Johansen. Each song is sung in French even though most of the artists do not speak the language. The two instrumental tracks do not identify the musicians performing. Savoy later reunited with Ronstadt to record the album Adieu False Heart; released in 2006, it would be Ronstadt's final album before her retirement.

Reception

Evangeline Made was nominated for Best Traditional Folk Album at the 45th Grammy Awards.

Music critic Richie Unterberger, writing for AllMusic, rated the album 4 of 5 stars, writing: "The production is understated and sympathetic, as it's neither hardcore Cajun music nor Cajun music that's been bleached into pop… Purists might find this something of a sellout, a dilution of the real and rawer thing for ears unaccustomed to the real deal. Perhaps they have viable points, but here's a fact which might be hard for them to face: this simply has much more variety, skillful singing, and thoughtful, pleasing production than most Cajun records do, without compromising the spirit of the music."

Writing for No Depression, Don McLeese called the album "musical interplay so soulful and vibrant it transcends the language barrier." and avers the collection "honors the music not as a folk purist’s artifact, but as a living dynamic. Not one of the fourteen cuts seems less than a labor of love"

Music critic Mike Warren reviewed the album for The Pitch and of the songs, wrote, "Because they're in French, and because they're sexy as hell, the songs have an air of sultry mystery that's part of the best Cajun music."

Track listing 
"Vagabond Special" (Marc Savoy) – 2:56
performed by an all-star band of Cajun musicians
"La Chanson d'Une Fille de Quinze Ans (Song of a Fifteen Year Old Girl)" (Traditional; lyrics by Marc Savoy and Ann Savoy) – 2:26
performed by Ann Savoy and featuring Linda Ronstadt
"Diggy Liggy Lo" (J. D. Miller) – 3:22
performed by John Fogerty
"Je Veux Plus Te Voir (I Don't Want You Anymore)" (Belton Richard) – 3:31
performed Linda Thompson
"Pa Janvier, Laisse Moi M'En Aller (Pa Janvier, Let Me Go)" (Traditional; with new lyrics by Ann Savoy) – 3:54
performed by Patty Griffin
"Les Flammes d'Enfer (The Flames of Hell)" (Austin Pitre) – 2:35
performed by Richard Thompson
"Ma Mule (My Mule)" (Traditional; arranged by David Johansen and Brian Koonin) – 3:24
performed by David Johansen
"Ma Blonde Est Partie (My Blonde Left)" (Traditional) – 2:35
performed by Maria McKee
"Blues de Bosco (Bosco Blues)" (Eddie Shuler) – 4:21
performed by  Rodney Crowell
"O, Ma Chère 'Tite Fille (Oh, My Dear Little Girl)" (Cléoma Falcon, with English lyrics by Ann Savoy) – 3:49
Ann Savoy and featuring Linda Ronstadt
"Valse de Balfa (Balfa Waltz)" (Will Balfa) – 2:56
performed by Linda Thompson
"Two Step de Prairie Soileau" (Traditional; arranged by Marc and Ann Savoy) – 4:03
performed by an all-star band of Cajun musicians
"Arrêtte Pas la Musique (Don't Stop the Music)" (George Jones) – 3:00
performed by Nick Lowe
"Tout un Beau Soir en Me Promenant (On a Beautiful Evening While ...)" (Traditional; arranged by Ann Savoy) – 3:12
performed by Maria McKee

Personnel
Linda Ronstadt – vocals, harmony vocals
Ann Savoy – vocals, harmony vocals, fiddle, guitar
John Fogerty – vocals, guitar
Rodney Crowell – vocals, guitar
Patty Griffin – vocals
Nick Lowe – vocals
Maria McKee – vocals
David Johansen – vocals, harmonica
Christine Balfa – guitar, triangle
Richard Thompson – vocals, guitar
Jimmy Breaux – accordion
Austin Broussard – drums
Sam Broussard – guitar, slide guitar
Mike Burch – drums
Michael Doucet – fiddle
David Greeley – fiddle
Kevin Wimmer – fiddle
David Doucet – guitar
Jane Vidrine – guitar
Rodney Miller – steel guitar
Kevin Dugas – drums, triangle
David Egan – piano
Brian Koonin – guitar, cardboard box, toy organ
Sonny Landreth – slide guitar
Dirk Powell – accordion, bass, fiddle
Mitchell Reed – bass
Marc Savoy – accordion
Wilson Savoy – piano
Production notes:
Ann Savoy – producer, arranger, liner notes, photography
Steve Buckingham – executive producer
Marc Savoy – arranger
David Johansen – arranger
Brian Koonin – arranger, engineer
Tom Rothrock – engineer
Scott Ardoin – engineer
Jim Brady – engineer
Erich Gobel – engineer
Edward Haber – engineer
Nick Hannan – engineer
David Rachou – engineer
Kevin Lacey – engineer
Tony Daigle – engineer, mastering, mixing
Jim Bessman – liner notes
Jennie Carey – production assistant
John Fago – photography
Chris Gabrin – photography
Jim Akin – photography
Miranda Penn Turin – photography

References

External links
NPR interview with Ann Savoy

2002 albums
Ann Savoy albums
Vanguard Records albums